Sarayevo is a rural locality (a selo) in Gorodetskoye Rural Settlement, Kichmengsko-Gorodetsky District, Vologda Oblast, Russia. The population was 82 as of 2002. There are 4 streets.

Geography 
Sarayevo is located 42 km northwest of Kichmengsky Gorodok (the district's administrative centre) by road. Ovsyannikovo is the nearest rural locality.

References 

Rural localities in Kichmengsko-Gorodetsky District